This is a list of buildings that are examples of the Art Deco architectural style in Louisiana, United States.

Baton Rouge 
 Baton Rouge Savings and Loan Association, Baton Rouge
 Campbell Apartment Building, Baton Rouge, 1930
 Howard Auditorium, Louisiana State University, Baton Rouge, 1940
 S. H. Kress and Co. Building, Baton Rouge, 1935, 1960
 Lincoln Theater, Baton Rouge, 1950
 Louisiana State Capitol, Baton Rouge, 1932
 United States Post Office and Courthouse, Baton Rouge, 1932

Lake Charles 
 Artists Civic Theatre and Studio (ACTS) Theatre, Lake Charles, 1940
 Bulber Auditorium, McNeese State University, Lake Charles, 1940
 Kaufman Hall, McNeese State University, Lake Charles, 1941

New Orleans 
 Algy Theater, New Orleans, 1940s
 Alvar Street Library, New Orleans, 1940
 Ashton B&B (former Ashton Theater), New Orleans, 1927
 Blue Plate Building, New Orleans, 1941
 Carver Theater, New Orleans, 1950
 Charity Hospital, New Orleans, 1939
 Eleanor McMain Secondary School, New Orleans, 1932
 F. Edward Hebert Federal Building, New Orleans, 1939
 Flint-Goodridge Hospital of Dillard University, New Orleans, 1931
 Gem Theater, New Orleans, 1947
 General Laundry Cleaners & Dryers, New Orleans, 1929
 Gus Mayer Department Store, New Orleans, 1948
 Joy Theater, New Orleans, 1947
 Lakefront Airport, New Orleans, 1930s
 Mangel's, New Orleans
 National American Bank Building, New Orleans, 1929
 Orleans Parish Criminal Court, New Orleans, 1931
 Rosetree Blown Glass Studio and Gallery (former Rosetree Theater), 1930s
 Sister Stanislaus Memorial Building, New Orleans, 1938
 Tivoli Theatre, New Orleans, 1927
 Tremé Market, New Orleans
 William Frantz Elementary School, New Orleans, 1937

New Iberia 
 Evangeline Theater (now Sliman Theatre for the Performing Arts), 129 East Main Street, Downtown New Iberia Commercial Historic District, New Iberia, 1929 and 1940
 Iberia Parish Courthouse and Jail, New Iberia, 1940
 Wormser's Department Store, New Iberia

Shreveport 
 Capri Theatre (former Saenger Theatre), Shreveport, 1911 and 1940s
 Louisiana State Exhibit Building, Shreveport, 1937
 Masonic Temple, Shreveport, 1937
 Salvation Army, Shreveport, 1937
 Shreveport Municipal Memorial Auditorium, Shreveport, 1929

Other cities 
 Acadia City Hall, Crowley Historic District, Crowley, 1931
 Acadia Parish Courthouse, Crowley Historic District, Crowley, 1952
 Big D Corral Theatre, DeRidder Commercial Historic District, DeRidder, 1940
 Caldwell Parish Courthouse, Columbia, 1937
 City Hall, Winnfield, 1937
 Concordia Parish Courthouse, Vidalia, 1939
 Denham Springs City Hall, Denham Springs, 1940
 Dixie Center for the Arts, Ruston, 1928 and 1933
 Dual State Monument, Union County, 1931
 East Carroll Parish Courthouse and Jail, Lake Providence, 1938
 Fiske Theatre, Oak Grove, West Carroll Parish, 1950
 Gymnasium, Napoleonville, 1930s
 Jackson Parish Courthouse and Jail, Jonesboro, 1938
 Lafayette International Center, Lafayette, 1939
 Lafourche Parish Jail, Thibodoaux, 1940s
 Mama's Place, Metairie
 More Mileage Gas Station, Jennings, 1938
 Napoleon Middle School Gymnasium, Napoleonville, 1939
 Natchitoches Parish Courthouse, Natchitoches, 1940
 Old Brusly High School Gymnasium, Brusly, 1937
 Palace Theatre, Jonesboro, 1929
 Port Allen High School, Port Allen, 1937
 Rapides Parish Courthouse and Jail, Alexandria, 1940
 Rayville Light & Water Plant, Rayville, 1940
 Rice Theatre, Crowley Historic District, Crowley, 1941
 Ruston High School, Ruston, 1921 and 1940
 St. Bernard Parish Courthouse, Chalmette, 1939
 St. Helena Parish Courthouse, Greensburg, 1937
 St. Landry Parish Courthouse, Opelousas Historic District, Opelousas, 1940
 Strand Theatre, Jennings, 1939
 United States Post Office, Leesville, 1936
 United States Post Office and Courthouse, Alexandria, 1932
 United States Post Office and Courthouse, Arcadia, 1937
 United States Post Office and Courthouse, Monroe, 1934

See also 
 List of Art Deco architecture
 List of Art Deco architecture in the United States

References 

 "Art Deco & Streamline Moderne Buildings." Roadside Architecture.com. Retrieved 2019-01-03.
 Cinema Treasures. Retrieved 2022-09-06
 "Court House Lover". Flickr. Retrieved 2022-09-06
 "New Deal Map". The Living New Deal. Retrieved 2020-12-25.
 "SAH Archipedia". Society of Architectural Historians. Retrieved 2021-11-21.

External links 
 

 
Art Deco
Art Deco architecture in the United States